Good Morning Australia (or GMA)  is an Australian breakfast television program that was broadcast on Network Ten. It aired from 23 February 1981 until 18 December 1992.

History
The original Good Morning Australia breakfast television program was a news and entertainment show broadcast by Network Ten on weekdays from 7:00 to 9:00am. It debuted on 23 February 1981 with Gordon Elliott and Sue Kellaway co-hosting and with Di Morrissey as the roving reporter. Kellaway departed shortly after the program began and was replaced by Kerri-Anne Kennerley, who stayed with the program until the end of 1991 when she was replaced by Sandra Sully, Joy Smithers and then Sandra Sully again.

The male co-host position on GMA was filled by Tim Webster, Mike Gibson, Terry Willesee, Webster again, Mike Hammond and Ron Wilson.

The breakfast program competed with the Nine Network's Today (which launched in 1982 with Sue Kellaway, initial co-host of the Ten show) and usually placed second in the ratings behind Today.

In 1992, Good Morning Australia moved to the 6:30 to 8:30am timeslot, coinciding with the launch of The Morning Show with Bert Newton. Good Morning Australia, as a breakfast news program, was cancelled at the end of 1992. The name was taken over by Bert Newton's morning program and became Good Morning Australia with Bert Newton, which ran until 2005.

Since the demise of the original Good Morning Australia, other breakfast programs have arisen such as Sunrise and ABC News Breakfast, Weekend Today, Weekend Sunrise and Weekend Breakfast.

See also 
 List of Australian television series

References 

1981 Australian television series debuts
1992 Australian television series endings
Australian television news shows
Breakfast television in Australia
English-language television shows
Network 10 original programming
Television shows set in Sydney
10 News First